Miss Venezuela 2001 was the 48th Miss Venezuela pageant, was held in Caracas, Venezuela, on September 14, 2001, after weeks of events.  The winner of the pageant was Cynthia Lander, Miss Distrito Capital.

The pageant was broadcast live on Venevision from the Poliedro de Caracas in Caracas, Venezuela. At the conclusion of the final night of competition, outgoing titleholder Eva Ekvall crowned Cynthia Lander of Distrito Capital as the new Miss Venezuela.

Results

Special awards
 Miss Photogenic (voted by press reporters) - Norelys Rodríguez (Miss Vargas)
 Miss Internet (voted by www.missvenezuela.com viewers) - Jerika Hoffmann (Miss Carabobo)
 Miss Congeniality (voted by Miss Venezuela contestants) - Norelys Rodríguez (Miss Vargas)
 Miss Personality - Norelys Rodríguez (Miss Vargas)
 Miss Figure - Cynthia Lander (Distrito Capital)
 Best Hair - Mariaeugenia Rivero (Miss Amazonas)
 Best Smile - Lorena Delgado (Miss Trujillo)
 Best Face - Jerika Hoffmann (Miss Carabobo)
 Best Skin - Carolina Groening (Miss Portuguesa)
 Best Runway - Maria Alejandra Carballo (Miss Apure)
 Miss Integral - Jerika Hoffmann (Miss Carabobo)
 Best Legs - Federica Guzmán Miss Miranda

Delegates
The Miss Venezuela 2001 delegates are:

Notes
Cynthia Lander placed as 4th runner up in Miss Universe 2002 in San Juan, Puerto Rico. She also placed as 1st runner up in Miss Mesoamérica 2002 in Houston, Texas, United States.
Aura Zambrano placed as 1st runner up in Miss International 2001 in Tokyo, Japan. She also placed 2nd runner up in Reinado Internacional del Café 2002 in Manizales, Colombia, and 4th runner up in Miss Intercontinental 2002 in Fürth, Germany.
Norelys Rodríguez placed as 1st runner up in Reina Sudamericana 2001 in Santa Cruz, Bolivia.
Lorena Delgado placed as 1st runner up in Miss Atlántico Internacional 2002 in Punta del Este, Uruguay.
Keidy Moreno won World Super Model 2002 contest in Beirut, Lebanon.
Jerika Hoffmann previously placed as 2nd runner up in Top Model of the World 2000 in Vreden, Germany.
María Cristina López previously placed as 2nd runner up in Miss Tourism International 2000 in Kuala Lumpur, Malaysia.
Federica Guzmán placed as semifinalist in Miss World 2006 in Warsaw, Poland.

References

External links
Miss Venezuela official website

Miss Venezuela
2001 beauty pageants